Hawk Mountain is a mountain located in the Catskill Mountains of New York northeast of Hancock. Jehu Mountain is located southeast, Point Mountain is located southwest, and Coon Hill is located west of Hawk Mountain.

References

Mountains of Delaware County, New York
Mountains of New York (state)